Ethon Sean O'Driscoll-Varian (born 7 September 2001) is an Irish professional footballer who plays as a striker for League of Ireland Premier Division club Cork City, on loan from Bohemians.

Career

Stoke City
Varian was born in Cork and began playing youth football with Greenwood FC in Togher. He moved to England in 2018 joining the Stoke City Academy. Varian spent January 2020 at Nantwich Town on work experience where he scored twice on his debut against Hyde United. In July 2021 Varian joined Scottish Championship side Raith Rovers on a six-month loan. He made his professional debut on 21 July 2021 in a 0–0 draw against Livingston in the Scottish League Cup. His loan was extended in December 2021 until the end of the 2021–22 season Varian made 43 appearances for Raith scoring three goals as they narrowly missed out on a play-off spot. He helped Raith to win the Scottish Challenge Cup  after beating Queen of the South 3–1 in the final.

Bohemians
On 8 July 2022, Varian signed for League of Ireland Premier Division side Bohemians. After 6 months at the club it was announced that he would be joining his hometown club Cork City on loan for the 2023 season.

International career
Varian made his Republic of Ireland U21 debut against Wales on 26 March 2021.

Career statistics

Honours
 Raith Rovers
Scottish Challenge Cup: 2022

References

Republic of Ireland association footballers
2001 births
Living people
Stoke City F.C. players
Nantwich Town F.C. players
Raith Rovers F.C. players
Bohemian F.C. players
Cork City F.C. players
Association football forwards
Scottish Professional Football League players
League of Ireland players